Issuna is a village and administrative ward in the Singida Rural district of the Singida Region of Tanzania. According to the 2002 census, the ward has a total population of 11,285.

Transport 
Issuna has a railway station on the Singida branch line from Manyoni junction.  It is also situated on the B141 road.

Incidents 
In January 1963, there was an incident involving two lions and livestock. The lions killed 3 donkeys and 244 cattle before being shot.

See also 
 East Africa

References 

Wards of Singida Region